A power symbol is a symbol indicating that a control activates or deactivates a particular device. Such a control may be a rocker switch, a toggle switch, a push-button, a virtual switch on a display screen, or some other user interface. The internationally standardized symbols are intended to communicate their function in a language-independent manner.

Description
The well-known on/off power symbol was the result of the logical evolution in user interface design. Originally, most early power controls consisted of switches that were toggled between two states demarcated by the words On and Off. As technology became more ubiquitous, these English words were replaced with the universal symbols line "|" for "on" and circle "◯" for "off" (typically without serifs) to bypass language barriers. This standard is still used on toggle power switches.

The symbol for the standby button was created by superimposing the symbols "|" and "◯"; however, it is commonly interpreted as the numerals "0" and "1" (binary code); yet, the International Electrotechnical Commission (IEC) holds these symbols as a graphical representation of a line and a circle.

Standby symbol ambiguity
Because the exact meaning of the standby symbol on a given device may be unclear until the control is tried, it has been proposed that a separate sleep symbol, a crescent moon, instead be used to indicate a low power state. Proponents include the California Energy Commission and the Institute of Electrical and Electronics Engineers. Under this proposal, the older standby symbol would be redefined as a generic "power" indication, in cases where the difference between it and the other power symbols would not present a safety concern. This alternative symbolism was published as IEEE standard 1621 on December 8, 2004.

Standards
Universal power symbols are described in the International Electrotechnical Commission (IEC) 60417 standard, Graphical symbols for use on equipment, appearing in the 1973 edition of the document (as IEC 417) and informally used earlier.

Unicode
Because of widespread use of the power symbol, a campaign was launched to add the set of characters to Unicode. In February 2015, the proposal was accepted by Unicode and the characters were included in Unicode 9.0.

In popular culture

The standby symbol, frequently seen on personal computers, is a popular icon among technology enthusiasts. It is often found emblazoned on fashion items including t-shirts and cuff-links. It has also been used in corporate logos, such as for Gateway, Inc. (circa 2002), Staples, Inc. easytech, Exelon, Toggl and others, as record sleeve art (Garbage's "Push It") and even as personal tattoos. In March 2010, the New York City health department announced they would be using it on condom wrappers. The 2012 television series Revolution, set in a dystopian future in which "the power went out", as the opening narration puts it, stylized the second last letter 'o' of its title as the standby symbol. The power symbol was a part of exhibition at MoMA. In the anime Dimension W, Kyouma Mabuchi wears a Happi with the power symbol on his back. In the television series Sense8, the hacktivist character Nomi has a tattoo of the power symbol behind her ear.

The symbol, rotated clockwise by 90 degrees so it looks like a capital G, becomes part of the logo for Channel 5's programme The Gadget Show.

On 15th October 2019, 786 employees of Volkswagen Group United Kingdom Limited formed the world's largest human power symbol at Millbrook Proving Ground.

See also
 List of international common standards
 Reset button

References

External links

 IEC/ISO Database on Graphical Symbols for Use on Equipment
 IEC Graphical Symbols for Use on Equipment
 ISO/IEC/JTC1 Graphical Symbols for Office Equipment, Environmental Energy Technologies Division, Lawrence Berkeley National Laboratory

Pictograms
IEC standards
IEEE standards